The Modern Records Centre (MRC) is the specialist archive service of the University of Warwick in Coventry, England, located adjacent to the Central Campus Library. It was established in October 1973 and holds the world's largest archive collection on British industrial relations, as well as archives relating to many other aspects of British social, political and economic history.

The BP corporate archive is located next to the MRC, but has separate staff and facilities.

Holdings

Trade unions
The Modern Records Centre holds by far the largest collection of archives of British trade unions in the country. The largest collection held in the centre is the archive of the Trades Union Congress (TUC).

Other significant collections of archives relating to British trade unions include:

Amalgamated Engineering Union / Amalgamated Society of Engineers
Amalgamated Slaters' and Tilers' Provident Society
Amalgamated Society of Carpenters and Joiners
Amalgamated Society of Lithographic Printers and Auxiliaries
Amalgamated Society of Woodworkers
Amalgamated Union of Building Trade Workers
Associated Blacksmiths', Forge and Smithy Workers' Society / Associated Blacksmiths' Society
Associated Society of Locomotive Engineers and Firemen (ASLEF)
Association of Assistant Mistresses
Association of Building Technicians / Association of Architects, Surveyors and Technical Assistants
Association of Engineering and Shipbuilding Draughtsmen
Association of Executive Officers / Second Division Clerks' Association
Association of Head Mistresses
Association of Professional, Executive, Clerical and Computer Staff (APEX)/ Clerical and Administrative Workers' Union / National Union of Clerks
Association of Scientific, Technical and Managerial Staffs (ASTMS)
Association of Scientific Workers
Association of Supervisory Staffs, Executives and Technicians (ASSET) / National Foremen's Association
Association of Teachers in Colleges and Departments of Education
Association of Teachers in Technical Institutions
Association of University Teachers
Barclays Bank Staff Association
British Airline Pilots' Association
Civil and Public Services Association / Civil Service Clerical Association
Communication Managers' Association / Post Office Management Staffs Association / Association of Post Office Controlling Officers
Community and Youth Workers' Union
Confederation of Health Service Employees (COHSE)
Connect
Constructional Engineering Union
Electrical Trades Union
Fire Brigades Union
Friendly Society of Iron Founders
Friendly Society of Operative Stonemasons
General Union of Carpenters and Joiners
Guild of Insurance Officials
Headmasters' Association / Incorporated Association of Headmasters
Inland Revenue Staff Federation
Iron and Steel Trades Confederation
London Society of Compositors
London Typographical Society
Manchester Unity of Operative Bricklayers' Society
Mental Hospital and Institutional Workers' Union / National Asylum Workers' Union
Midland Bank Staff Association
Monotype Casters' and Typefounders' Society / Amalgamated Typefounders' Trade Society
National Amalgamated Stevedores and Dockers
National and Local Government Officers' Association (NALGO)
National Association of Operative Plasterers
National Association of Schoolmasters
National Association of Teachers in Further and Higher Education
National Graphical Association
National League of the Blind and Disabled / National League of the Blind
National Society of Metal Mechanics / National Society of Brass and Metal Mechanics / National Society of Amalgamated Brassworkers
National Society of Operative Printers and Assistants (Natsopa)
National Society of Painters / National Amalgamated Society of Operative House and Ship Painters and Decorators / National Amalgamated Society of Operative House Painters and Decorators
National Union of Bank Employees / Bank Officers' Guild
National Union of Boot and Shoe Operatives
National Union of County Officers
National Union of Enginemen, Firemen, Mechanics and Electrical Workers / National Amalgamated Union of Enginemen
National Union of Foundry Workers / Amalgamated Union of Foundry Workers
National Union of General and Municipal Workers
National Union of Glovers and Leather Workers
National Union of Hosiery and Knitwear Workers
National Union of Journalists
National Union of Printing, Bookbinding and Paper Workers
National Union of Public Employees (NUPE) / National Union of Corporation Workers
National Union of Railwaymen / Amalgamated Society of Railway Servants
National Union of Seamen
National Union of Sheet Metal Workers and Braziers
National Union of Sheet Metal Workers, Coppersmiths, Heating and Domestic Engineers
National Union of Teachers
National Union of Vehicle Builders / United Kingdom Society of Coachmakers
National Union of Wallcoverings, Decorative and Allied Trades / Wallpaper Workers' Union
Operative Bricklayers' Society
Plumbing Trades Union / United Operative Plumbers' Association
Postmen's Federation
Post Office Controlling Officers' Association
Post Office Engineering Union
Printing Machine Managers' Trade Society
Prospect
Prudential Staff Union
Royal London Staff Association
Scottish Sheet-Metal Workers' and Braziers' Friendly and Protective Society
Sign and Display Trade Union / National Union of Sign, Glass and Ticket Writers and Kindred Trades
Society of Chiropodists
Society of Civil and Public Servants / Society of Civil Servants
Society of Graphical and Allied Trades (SOGAT)
Society of Lithographic Artists, Designers, Engravers and Process Workers (SLADE)
Society of Radiographers
Society of Telecommunication Engineers / Society of Post Office Engineering Inspectors
Steel Industry Management Association
Tobacco Workers' Union
Training College Association
Transport and General Workers' Union
Transport Salaried Staffs' Association / Railway Clerks' Association
Typographical Association
Union of Bookmakers' Employees
Union of Communication Workers / Union of Post Office Workers
Unison
Unite
United Commercial Travellers' Association
United Kingdom Association of Professional Engineers
United Patternmakers' Association
United Society of Boilermakers, Shipbuilders and Structural Workers / United Society of Boilermakers and Iron Shipbuilders
Wallpaper Trades Superannuation Society
Workers' Union

Significant collections relating to trade union federations include the Confederation of Employee Organisations, the Confederation of Shipbuilding and Engineering Unions, the Council of Civil Service Unions, the Federation of Post Office Supervising Officers, the General Federation of Trade Unions, the National Federation of Construction Unions (formerly the National Federation of Building Trade Operatives), the National Federation of Professional Workers, the National Joint Committee of Postal and Telegraph Associations, the Post Office Engineering Federation, and the Printing and Kindred Trades Federation.

International trade union federations are represented by major collections of the International Transport Workers' Federation and the World Federation of Scientific Workers.

Collections relating to joint trade union committees include those of the Alcan Foils Wembley Factory trade union committees, the British Leyland Trade Union Committee, Coventry Chain Shop Stewards' Committee, Coventry Trades Council, the GCHQ Trade Union Campaign Committee, and the London Transport Aldenham Bus Overhaul Works trade union committees.

The centre also holds significant collections relating to leaders of trade unions, including:

Ernest Bevin, general secretary of the Transport and General Workers' Union, Minister of Labour and Foreign Secretary
Rodney Bickerstaffe, general secretary of NUPE and Unison
Frank Chapple, Baron Chapple of Hoxton, general secretary of the Electrical Trades Union and Electrical, Electronic, Telecommunication and Plumbing Union
Percy Collick, assistant general secretary of ASLEF and Labour MP
Frank Cousins, general secretary of the Transport and General Workers' Union and Minister of Technology
Frank Crump, general secretary of the National Amalgamated Union of Life Assurance Workers
Brenda Dean, Baroness Dean of Thornton-le-Fylde, general secretary of SOGAT '82
R. A. W. Emerick, general secretary of the Amalgamated Society of Lithographic Printers
Alan Fisher, general secretary of NUPE
Sir Joseph Hallsworth, general secretary of the Amalgamated Union of Co-operative Employees, National Union of Distributive and Allied Workers, and Union of Shop, Distributive and Allied Workers
Clive Jenkins, general secretary of ASSET, ASTMS and the MSF
Jack Jones, general secretary of the Transport and General Workers' Union
Bill Morris, Baron Morris of Handsworth, general secretary of the Transport and General Workers' Union
Ron Todd, general secretary of the Transport and General Workers' Union
Paul Tofahrn, assistant general secretary of the International Transport Workers' Federation and general secretary of Public  Services International
Bob Willis, general secretary of the London Society of Compositors, London Typographical Society, and National Graphical Association
George Woodcock, general secretary of the Trades Union Congress

Large collections of papers of more junior trade unionists include:

Jon Appleton, of NALGO and Unison
Alfred Best, of the National Amalgamated Union of Life Assurance Workers
Cyril Collard, of the Association of Teachers in Technical Institutions
John Dore, of the Association of Scientific Workers, ASTMS and the MSF
David and Tamar Edwards, of the Amalgamated Engineering Union and the Transport and General Workers' Union respectively
Dick Etheridge, of the Amalgamated Engineering Union
R. Leonard Fagg, of the Post Office Engineering Union
Monty Hughes, of the Iron and Steel Trades Confederation
Norman Jacobs, of the Civil and Public Services Association
J. C. McLauchlan, of the Institution of Professional Civil Servants
David Michaelson, of the Amalgamated Engineering Union
Peter Morgan, of NALGO
Peter Nicholas, of the Amalgamated Engineering Union
Aaron Rapoport Rollin, of the National Union of Tailors and Garment Workers
William Henry Stokes, of the Amalgamated Engineering Union
Alan Thornett, of the Transport and General Workers' Union
Arthur Willitt, of the Post Office Engineering Union, Society of Post Office Engineering Inspectors, Society of the Post-Office Engineering Inspectorate, Society of Telecommunication Engineers, Association of Post Office Executives, and Society of Post Office Executives
Amicia Young, of the Association of Scientific Workers

Industrial relations
The Modern Records Centre holds some collections of archives relating to joint employer/employee industrial relations negotiating committees. Significant among these are the Inland Revenue Departmental Whitley Council, the Joint Industry Board for the Electrical Contracting Industry, the Local Authorities' Conditions of Service Advisory Board (LACSAB), the National Joint Council for the Engineering Construction Industry, the National Maritime Board, and the National Whitley Council for the Civil Service.

Papers of various academics and/or conciliators concerned with industrial relations include those of Sir George Bain, William Brown, Colleen Chesterman, Hugh Clegg, Bob Fryer, Geoffrey Goodman, Richard Hyman, Grigor McClelland, Arthur Marsh, Sir Jack Scamp, and Bert Turner.

Archives of the British Universities Industrial Relations Association, Incomes Data Services and Industrial Relations Research Unit are also held.

Employers' and trade associations
The Modern Records Centre also collects archives of employers' associations and trade associations.  The largest of these are the archives of the Confederation of British Industry (CBI) and its predecessor, the Federation of British Industries (FBI).

Other major association employers' and trade association collections include:

Apparel and Fashion Industry Association
Association of Professional Recording Services
Biscuit, Cake, Chocolate and Confectionery Alliance
Brewers' Society
British Electrotechnical and Allied Manufacturers' Association
British Employers' Confederation / National Confederation of Employers' Organisations
British Independent Steel Producers' Association
British Iron and Steel Consumers' Council
British Iron and Steel Federation
Chamber of Shipping
Coventry and District Engineering Employers' Association
Cycle and Motor Cycle Association / Cycle and Motor Cycle Manufacturers' and Traders' Union
Engineering Employers' East Midlands Association
Engineering Employers' Federation / Engineering and Allied Employers' National Federation
Engineering Employers' West Midlands Association
Iron and Steel Trades Employers' Association
Knitting Industries' Federation
National Association of British Manufacturers
National Engineering Construction Employers' Association
National Federation of Building Trades Employers / Association of Master Builders
National Industrial Organisation
Oil and Chemical Plant Constructors' Association
Refractory Users' Federation
Road Haulage Association
Scottish Steel Makers' Association
Shipping Federation
Shirt, Collar and Tie Manufacturers' Federation
Society of British Gas Industries
Tea Council of Great Britain
UK Fashion and Textile Association
Wholesale Clothing Manufacturers' Federation

Archives of related organisations include those of the Dollar Exports Council, India, Pakistan and Burma Association, Iron and Steel Board and Trade Board (Employers') Consultative Council, as well as those of Richard Wood, an official of the Construction Industry Training Board and the National Federation of Building Trades Employers.

Pressure and campaigning groups
A second part of the Modern Records Centre's collecting base is the archives of pressure and campaigning groups. Significant among these are the archives of the:

All Britain Anti-Poll Tax Federation
Amnesty International
Anti-Nazi League
Campaign for Nuclear Disarmament (CND)
Campaign for the Advancement of State Education
Christian Campaign for Nuclear Disarmament
Council for Educational Advance
Economic League
Family Service Units
Howard League for Penal Reform
Industrial Society / Industrial Welfare Society
Involvement and Participation Association / Industrial Co-partnership Association / Labour Co-partnership Association
Make Poverty History
National Association for the Care and Resettlement of Offenders (NACRO) / National Association of Discharged Prisoners' Aid Societies
National Federation of the Blind of the United Kingdom
National Postgraduate Committee
National Union of Students
Release
West Midlands Campaign for Nuclear Disarmament
World University Service

Papers of individuals associated with campaigning and pressure groups include those of Marjory Allen, Lady Allen of Hurtwood, landscape architect, campaigner for pre-school education and child welfare, Sir Ernest Benn, publisher, libertarian and individualist, Mary Brennan, peace activist and prominent member of CND, William Driscoll, chief training officer of the Economic League, Sir Victor Gollancz, publisher and activist, Sir Leslie Scott, Conservative MP, judge and prominent member of the Council for the Preservation of Rural England, and Dame Eileen Younghusband, social worker.

Business
The Modern Records Centre holds some archives relating to business, especially the motor industry.

Archives relating to the motor industry include Jensen Motors, the Rover Company, Rubery Owen, the Standard Motor Company, and the Triumph Engineering Company.

Archives relating to other firms include Birmingham Small Arms, the British Steel Corporation, Victor Gollancz Ltd, Wallpaper Manufacturers Ltd, and J. Parnell & Son Ltd, builders, of Rugby.

The centre also holds the archives of the Transport Development Group and of Arthur Primrose Young, manager of the Rugby works of the British Thomson-Houston Company.

Professional associations
The Modern Records Centre holds a growing collection of the archives of professional associations, especially those associated with social work. Major collections in the latter area include the Association of Child Care Officers, the Association of Social Workers, the British Association of Social Workers, the Institute of Medical Social Workers, the National Association of Social Workers in Education, and the National Institute for Social Work.

Other professional associations with significant representation are the Association of Teachers of Domestic Science, the British Association for Commercial and Industrial Education, the British Institute of Management, the Headmasters' and Headmistresses' Conference, the Institute of Administrative Management, the Institute of Management Services, and the Institute of Personnel Management.

Politics
One of the collecting specialities of the Modern Records Centre is Trotskyist politics. Significant collections of papers relating to Trotskyist organisations include Bookmarks Publications, the International Marxist Group, the International Socialism Group, the Militant tendency, the Revolutionary Socialist League, the Socialist Party, Socialist Reproduction, the Socialist Vanguard Group, and the Spartacist League.

Papers of individuals associated with Trotskyist organisations include those of Chris Bambery, Colin Barker, Alan Clinton, Jimmy Deane, Reg Groves, Alistair Mutch, Geoff Pugh, Bob Purdie, Tony Whelan, and Harry Wicks.

The centre also holds the papers of several Labour Members of Parliament: Richard Crossman, Maurice Edelman, Terry Fields, William Hamling, Pat Wall, and William Wilson.

Other political holdings include the papers of former general secretary of the Labour Party Jim Mortimer, Conservative MP Derek Coombs, National Front activist Wayne Ashcroft, and the Warwick and Leamington Constituency Labour Party.

Education
A further specialisation of the Modern Records Centre is in archives concerned with education. As well as the archives of the teachers' trade unions, the Centre holds significant archive collections of the Association of Technical Institutions, the Committee of Directors of Polytechnics, the Committee of Vice-Chancellors and Principals, the Council for National Academic Awards, the Joint University Council for Social Studies, the National Council for Diplomas in Art and Design, the National Council for Technological Awards, REPLAN, the Society for Research into Higher Education, and the Universities Association for Lifelong Learning.

Cycling
The Modern Records Centre holds the National Cycle Archive, the principal archive covering all aspects of cycling history in the United Kingdom. This includes the archives of the Auto-Cycle Union, the Cyclists' Touring Club, and the National Cyclists' Union, as well as archives of many other cycling organisations and clubs, manufacturers of bicycles and accessories, and individuals connected with cycling, such as Eric Claxton, Tony Hadland, Alex Josey, Derek Roberts and Frank Rowland Whitt.

Operational research
A significant collection of material relating to operational research includes the archives of the Operational Research Branches of British Coal and the British Overseas Airways Corporation, the Department of Operational Research of the British Steel Corporation, the Institute for Operational Research, the International Federation of Operational Research Societies, the Local Government Operational Research Unit, and the Operational Research Society, as well as the papers of prominent operational researchers Ken Bowen and Stephen Cook.

University of Warwick
The Centre holds the organisational archives of the University of Warwick itself and also Coventry College of Education, which amalgamated with it in 1971. It also holds the papers of some individuals connected with the university, notably the sociologists Gillian Rose and Meg Stacey, and Sir Arthur Vick, who was the university's chairman of council and pro-chancellor.

Miscellaneous
Other significant collections include the Bristol Unity Players' Club, the Certification Office for Trade Unions and Employers' Associations, the Commercial Vehicle and Road Transport Club, the Low Pay Commission, the Royal Commission on Legal Services, the Royal Commission on the National Health Service, the Social Workers' Benevolent Trust, the Social Workers' Educational Trust, the Society for the Study of Labour History, and the Young Women's Christian Association. Papers of individuals include those of management consultant John Goddard, Catherine Hoskyns, an expert on gender politics and the European Union, and Sir George Pope, general manager of The Times.

External links
 Modern Records Centre

University of Warwick
Archives in the West Midlands (county)
1973 establishments in England
British trade unions history